The 1993 Major Indoor Lacrosse League season is the 7th season of the league that began on January 9, 1993, and concluded with the championship game on April 10. 1993 saw the only undefeated season in the history of the MILL/NLL; the Buffalo Bandits won all eight of their regular season games, then defeated Boston in the Divisional finals and Philadelphia in the Championship game to finish with a perfect 10-0 record.

Team movement
1993 saw no team changes from the 1992 season. The next season to see no team changes from the previous season did not occur until 2013.

Regular season

All Star Game
No All-Star Game was played in 1993.

Playoffs

Buffalo hosted the championship game.

Awards

All-Pro Teams
First Team:
Gary Gait, Philadelphia
Paul Gait, Philadelphia
Dave Pietramala, Pittsburgh
John Tavares, Buffalo
Jim Veltman, Buffalo
Dallas Eliuk, Philadelphia (goalie)

Second Team:
Thomas Carmean, Boston
Jeff Jackson, Baltimore
Derek Keenan, Buffalo
Rob Shek, Philadelphia
John Tucker, Baltimore
Sal LoCascio, New York (goalie)

Statistics leaders
Bold numbers indicate new single-season records. Italics indicate tied single-season records.

See also
 1993 in sports

References
1993 Archive at the Outsider's Guide to the NLL

MILL
Major Indoor Lacrosse League seasons